Euflavine is an antiseptic and disinfectant.

References 

Acridines
Aromatic amines
Quaternary ammonium compounds